The Manduvirá River (Spanish, Río Manduvirá) is a river of Paraguay. It is a tributary of the Paraguay River.

See also
List of rivers of Paraguay

References

Rand McNally, The New International Atlas, 1993.

Rivers of Paraguay
Tributaries of the Paraguay River